Charlie Nohra is an Australian rugby league player who represented Lebanon in the 2000 World Cup. He played ten games for Lebanon between 1999 and 2007 and played for the Sydney Bulls in the Jim Beam Cup.

References

Living people
Australian rugby league players
Lebanon national rugby league team players
Sydney Bulls players
Rugby league props
Year of birth missing (living people)